Gresia may refer to several villages in Romania:

 Gresia, a village in Bozioru Commune, Buzău County
 Gresia, a village in Starchiojd Commune, Prahova County
 Gresia, a village in Stejaru, Teleorman